Christopher Collier may refer to:

 Christopher Collier (cricketer) (1886–1916), English cricketer
 Christopher Collier (historian) (born 1930), American historian and author